Mount Vision may refer to:
 
 Mount Vision (Antarctica), a summit in Antarctica
 Mount Vision (New York), a summit east of Cooperstown in Otsego County, New York
 Mount Vision, New York, a hamlet in Otsego County, New York
 Mount Vision Fire, a wildfire in 1995